The Scout and Guide movement in Burkina Faso is served by two organisations 
 Association des Guides du Burkina Faso, member of the World Association of Girl Guides and Girl Scouts
 Fédération Burkinabé du Scoutisme, member of the World Organization of the Scout Movement

See also